Minuscule 85 (in the Gregory-Aland numbering), ε 391 (Soden), is a Greek minuscule manuscript of the New Testament, on parchment leaves. Palaeographically it has been assigned to the 13th century. It  has marginalia.

Description 

The codex contains the text of the four Gospels, with numerous lacunae, on 30 parchment leaves (size ), with numerous lacunae. The text is written in one column per page, 25 lines per page (size of text 10.1 by 6.2). The initial letters are written in red.

There is also a division according to the Ammonian Sections, (no references to the Eusebian Canons).

It contains lectionary markings at the margin (for liturgical use), and incipits.

 Contents
Matthew 8:15-9:17; 16:12-17.20; 24:26-45; 26:35-54; Mark 6:13-9.45; Luke 3:12-6.44; John 9:11-12:5; 19:6-24; 20:23-21:9.

 Text
The Greek text of the codex Kurt Aland did not place in any Category. 
It was not examined by the Claremont Profile Method.

History 

The manuscript used to be held in Augsburg (as codices 83, 84).

It was examined by Bengel (as August. 3), Scholz, and Dean Burgon. C. R. Gregory saw it in 1887.

It is housed in at the Bavarian State Library (Gr. 569), at München.

See also 

 List of New Testament minuscules
 Biblical manuscript
 Textual criticism

References

Further reading 

 

Greek New Testament minuscules
13th-century biblical manuscripts